Group captain is a senior commissioned rank in the Royal Air Force, where it originated, as well as the air forces of many countries that have historical British influence. It is sometimes used as the English translation of an equivalent rank in countries which have a non-British air force-specific rank structure. Group captain has a NATO rank code of OF-5,  meaning that it ranks above wing commander and immediately below air commodore, and is the equivalent of the rank of captain in the navy and of the rank of colonel in other services.

It is usually abbreviated Gp Capt.  In some air forces (such as the RAF, IAF and PAF), the abbreviation GPCAPT is used; in others (such as the RAAF and RNZAF), and
in many historical contexts, the abbreviation G/C is used. The full phrase “group captain” is always used; the rank is never abbreviated to "captain".

RAF usage
History
On 1 April 1918, the newly created RAF adopted its officer rank titles from the British Army, with Royal Naval Air Service captains and Royal Flying Corps colonels becoming colonels in the RAF. In response to the proposal that the RAF should use its own rank titles, it was suggested that the RAF might use the Royal Navy's officer ranks, with the word "air" inserted before the naval rank title. For example, the rank that later became group captain would have been "air captain". Although the Admiralty objected to this simple modification of their rank titles, it was agreed that the RAF might base many of its officer rank titles on naval officer ranks with differing pre-modifying terms. It was also suggested that RAF colonels might be entitled "bannerets" or "leaders". However, the rank title based on the Navy rank was preferred and as RAF colonels typically commanded groups the rank title group captain was chosen. The rank of group captain was introduced in August 1919 and has been used continuously since then.

Although in the early years of the RAF groups were normally commanded by group captains, by the mid-1920s they were usually commanded by an air officer.

In the post-World War II period the commander of an RAF flying station or a major ground training station has typically been a group captain. More recently, expeditionary air wings have also been commanded by group captains.

Insignia and command pennant
The rank insignia is based on the four gold bands of captains in the Royal Navy, comprising four narrow light blue bands over slightly wider black bands. This is worn on both the lower sleeves of the tunic or on the shoulders of the flying suit or the casual uniform.  Group captains are the first rank in the RAF hierarchy to wear gold braid on the peak of their cap, informally known as 'scrambled egg'; however, they still wear the standard RAF officer's cap badge.

The command pennant for a group captain is similar to the one for a wing commander except that there is one broad red band in the centre. Only the wing commander and group captain command pennants are triangular in shape.

Other air forces

The rank of group captain is also used in a number of the air forces in the Commonwealth, including the Bangladesh Air Force, Ghana Air Force, Indian Air Force (IAF), Namibian Air Force, Nigerian Air Force, Pakistan Air Force (PAF), Royal Australian Air Force (RAAF), Royal New Zealand Air Force (RNZAF), Sri Lankan Air Force and the Trinidad and Tobago Air Guard. It is also used in the Egyptian Air Force, Hellenic Air Force, Royal Air Force of Oman, Royal Thai Air Force and the Air Force of Zimbabwe.

The Royal Canadian Air Force used the rank until the unification of the Canadian Forces in 1968, when army-type rank titles were adopted. A Canadian group captain then became a colonel. In official French Canadian usage, a group captain's rank title was colonel d'aviation. In the Argentine Air Force comodoro (commodore) is the rank in Argentine Spanish while in the Chilean Air Force, the rank in Chilean Spanish is coronel de aviacion or "colonel of aviation". Until 1973 it was used by the Royal Malaysian Air Force (RMAF), beyond that the sleeve insignia is that of a full colonel.

Equivalent ranks in other services

In addition to the equivalents used in most air forces, such as colonel, other air services, especially non-combat auxiliaries in Commonwealth countries, have used a variety of alternative names for equivalent ranks.

The equivalent rank in the Women's Auxiliary Air Force, Women's Auxiliary Australian Air Force, Women's Royal Air Force (until 1968) and Princess Mary's Royal Air Force Nursing Service (until 1980) was "group officer".

The equivalent rank in the Royal Observer Corps (until 1995) was "observer captain", which had a similar rank insignia.

Notable group captains

 Sir Douglas Bader World War II fighter pilot and double amputee
 Clive Robertson "Killer" Caldwell , Cross of Valor (Poland)Australia's highest-scoring fighter ace, also the highest-scoring P-40 pilot from any air force and the highest-scoring Allied pilot in North Africa. Became one of a small group of pilots throughout history to become an "Ace in a day"
 Leonard Cheshire World War II bomber pilot and charity worker
 Walter Churchill World War II ace fighter pilot, who also evaluated various makes of fighter aircraft for the RAF, and played a key role in getting Spitfire aircraft to the defence of Malta
 Hugh DundasWorld War II fighter pilot and the youngest person to hold this rank, aged 24 years
 Thomas Loel GuinnessWorld War II fighter pilot, politician and businessman
 Hamish Mahaddie Scotsman who flew in Bomber Command and became a key member of the Pathfinder Force as chief procurer of aircrew talent, often referred to as Don Bennett's "horse thief"
 Sailor Malan DSO & Bar, DFC & Bar -  Royal Air Force flying ace who led No. 74 Squadron RAF during the Battle of Britain, authored the "Ten Simple Rules for Fighter Pilots" and under whose leadership No. 74 Squadron RAF changed outmoded RAF tactics and formations, changes later adopted by all of Fighter Command. In the 1969 cinema film Battle of Britain, the character of Squadron Leader Skipper played by Robert Shaw was based on Malan
 Herbert Masseyas a POW was Senior British Officer (SBO) at Stalag Luft III. He was portrayed in the movie The Great Escape (1963) as Group Captain Ramsey, and played by James Donald. Massey was crippled and walked with a stick, as did his character in the movie
 Virendera Singh Pathania, VrC, VM Indian Air force fighter pilot reputed for making first  confirmed kill in aerial dogfight during Indo-Pakistani War of 1965.
 Percy Charles Pickard World War II bomber pilot and captain of "F for Freddie" 
 Alan Rawlinson ,Australian RAAF World War II fighter ace and later commissioned into RAF
 Stanisław SkarżyńskiWorld War II bomber pilot. Commanding Officer RAF Lindholme. Polish Air Force. Transatlantic World Record Holder. Awarded Blériot Medal 1936
 James StaggRAF meteorologist involved in the planning of the D-Day invasion
 Clare Stevenson Director WAAAF
 Peter TownsendWorld War II pilot and suitor of Princess Margaret

Honorary 
 Sally Bridgeland - Non executive director, adviser and trustee. Investment consultant, actuary, and former CEO of the BP Pension Fund
 Bruce DickinsonFrontman of Iron Maiden. Honorary Gp. Capt. of 601 (County of London) Squadron RAF
 Sir Christopher Andrew Hoy Honorary Gp. Capt. as former Ambassador to the Royal Air Force Air Cadets
 Sachin TendulkarHonorary Indian Air Force group captain for his achievements in cricket
 Carol Vorderman Honorary Gp. Capt. as current Ambassador to the Royal Air Force Air Cadets

Fictional characters
 Ian Gilmore, a fictional character in Doctor Who
 Group Captain Tennant James, a fictional character in Doctor Who
 Captain Jack Harkness, a fictional character in Doctor Who and its spin-off Torchwood 
 Group Captain Lionel Mandrake, a fictional character in the film Dr. Strangelove, played by Peter Sellers
 Group Captain Rodney Crittendon, a fictional character in the television show Hogan's Heroes, played by Bernard Fox (Crittendon was titled on the show as the equivalent rank of colonel to avoid confusion with the American audience).

See also

 Air force officer rank insignia
 British and U.S. military ranks compared
 Comparative military ranks
 RAF officer ranks
 Ranks of the RAAF

References

Air force ranks
Military ranks of Australia
Former military ranks of Canada
Pakistan Air Force ranks
Military ranks of Bangladesh
Military ranks of Sri Lanka
Military ranks of the Commonwealth
Military ranks of the Royal Air Force